USCGC Legare has been the name of more than one United States Coast Guard ship, and may refer to:

 , later WMEC-144, a patrol boat, later medium endurance cutter, in commission from 1927 to 1968
 , a medium endurance cutter in commission since 1990

See also
 , a United States Revenue Cutter Service cutter in commission from 1844 to 1847

United States Coast Guard ship names